"" ("Pleasure of love") is a classical French love song written in 1784 by Jean-Paul-Égide Martini (1741–1816); it took its text from a poem by Jean-Pierre Claris de Florian (1755–1794), which appears in his novel Célestine.

The song was greatly successful in Martini's version. For example, a young woman, Madame Julie Charles, sang it to the poet Alphonse de Lamartine during his cure at Aix-les-Bains in 1816, and the poet was to recall it 30 years later.

Hector Berlioz arranged it for orchestra (H134) in 1859. Louis van Waefelghem arranged the tune for viola d'amore or viola and piano in the 1880s. It has been arranged and performed in various pop music settings.

Lyrics

Original poem by de Florian

Popular lyrics 
The joys of love are but a moment long
The pain of love endures the whole life long

Your eyes kissed mine, I saw the love in them shine
You brought me heaven right then when your eyes kissed mine.

My love loves me, and all thy wonders I see
The rainbow shines in my window, my love loves me

And now he's gone like a dream that fades into dawn
But the words stay locked in my heartstrings, my love loves me

Recordings
The Seekers
Rina Ketty in 1939 (with extended lyrics)
Joan Baez
Mary Hopkin in Welsh as "Pleserau Serch"
Nick Drake
Gabriel Yacoub on disc 9 Chansons d'Amore of the multi-volume Anthologie de la chanson française recorded in 1992–1994
 The Kings Singers, 1993, on their album Chansons D'amour

Judy Collins on her 2000 album Classic Folk
Paul Robeson
Mireille Mathieu on her album  (1985)
Nana Mouskouri and Charles Aznavour on the album Nana & Friends – Rendez-vous (2012)
Marianne Faithfull on her debut-album Marianne Faithfull (1965)
Jacky Terrasson on his 2000 album A Paris...
Charlotte Church Live in Jerusalem 2001

In popular culture
The melodies for Elvis Presley's "Can't Help Falling in Love" (1961) and the 20th century Christian hymn "My God Loves Me" are based on "Plaisir d'amour".

Mado Robin's version of the song plays in Djibril Diop Mambéty's 1973 film Touki Bouki when Nori and Anta go to visit a rich patron's estate in order to convince him to fund their trip to Paris. It is repeated a few times more throughout the remainder of the film.

The tune is heavily featured as a theme to the 1939 feature film "Love Affair" starring Charles Boyer and Irene Dunne, with Dunne also performing the song within her role as a singer

The song was sung by Montgomery Clift in the 1949 movie The Heiress.

A church choir performs this song for exhausted members of Easy Company in the episode entitled "The Breaking Point" in HBO's acclaimed miniseries Band of Brothers (miniseries).

References

External links 

Plaisir d' amour, hundreds of renditions by hundreds of artists, MusicMe.com
, sung by Rina Ketty (1939)
"Plaisir d'amour" ou petite histoire d'une romance de plus de 200 ans, history, sheet music and MIDI file, by Denis Havard de la Montagne 

Mélodies
1784 songs
Songs based on poems